Carts of Darkness is a 2008 National Film Board of Canada documentary film by Murray Siple about a group of homeless men in the city of North Vancouver, who use shopping carts to collect bottles and cans to return for money and also race down the city's steep slope for thrills.

The subjects in the film control the carts using only their weight and one foot, during descents that cross intersections, with top speeds claimed to be as high as 70 km/h.

Siple, a former director of extreme sports videos and an avid skateboarder and snowboarder, became a paraplegic after a car accident in 1996. His first film after his accident, Carts of Darkness allowed the filmmaker to regain the excitement he had experienced with extreme sports and to relate to a fellow group of outsiders.

Reception
Carts of Darkness was shown at public screenings in Vancouver and Victoria, with the film's subjects in attendance. It was also selected for the Hot Docs Canadian International Documentary Festival. The film received the Leo Award for Best Documentary Program in the Nature/ Environment/Adventure/Science/Technology category as well as the award for best documentary over 30 minutes
at the Picture This Film Festival in Calgary.

See also
 Shameless: The ART of Disability
 Redemption, a 2012 documentary film about people who redeem bottles and cans in New York City

References

External links
 
 Watch Carts of Darkness at NFB.ca
 

2008 films
Films shot in Vancouver
Documentary films about people with disability
National Film Board of Canada documentaries
North Vancouver (city)
2008 documentary films
Documentary films about homelessness in Canada
Recycling in Canada
2000s English-language films
2000s Canadian films
English-language Canadian films